Thomas Daniel may refer to:
Thomas Daniel (merchant) (1762–1854), Bristol merchant
Thomas Daniel (biologist), American biologist
Thomas Daniel (MP), Member of Parliament (MP) for Huntingdon, 1386–1390
Thomas Daniel (actor), actor in The Blue Seal
Thomas Daniel (pentathlete) (born 1985), Austrian modern pentathlete
Thomas Franklin Daniel (born 1954), American botanist and teacher
Tom Daniel (designer), creator of scale model kits for Monogram Models

See also
Thomas Daniell (1749–1840), painter